David Eduardo Achucarro Trinidad (born 5 January 1991) is an Argentine professional footballer who plays as a centre-back for Nueva Chicago.

Club career
Achucarro started out in the system of Boca Juniors, where he played at the 2011 U-20 Copa Libertadores. He made two appearances in the 2009–10 season, against Arsenal de Sarandí and Banfield respectively which were his only matches in the Primera División; though he did feature in the Copa Argentina in March 2012 versus Central Córdoba. Four months later, Achucarro was loaned to Douglas Haig. Twenty-eight games and one goal, against Crucero del Norte, came in Primera B Nacional. He returned to tier one with Godoy Cruz in 2013, prior to securing loans to Olimpo and Ferro Carril Oeste.

2016 saw Achucarro depart Boca Juniors permanently to sign with Talleres. Eleven appearances followed in the 2016 Primera B Nacional, which the club finished as champions to therefore win promotion to the Primera División. He subsequently left on 20 July 2016, joining top-flight Temperley. However, despite remaining for almost thirteen months, Achucarro didn't feature in any competitive fixture for the club. A return to Primera B Nacional was completed in August 2017, with the defender agreeing a move to Nueva Chicago. He made his debut on 2 October in a 2–0 win over All Boys at the Estadio Nueva Chicago.

On 11 June 2019, following two campaigns with Nueva Chicago, Achucarro went abroad for the first time after penning terms with Categoría Primera A side Cúcuta Deportivo. His bow for the Colombian outfit arrived on 15 July, playing for the full duration of a 1–3 win over Rionegro Águilas. He appeared nineteen times, prior to departing due to lack of payment. In January 2020, Achucarro switched Colombia for Chile as he signed for Deportes La Serena. Despite joining ahead of the 2020 season, Achucarro appeared in the 2019 play-offs which took place in January; as they won a spot in the Primera División.

International career
Achucarro represented Argentina's U20s at the 2011 Pan American Games, appearing in three fixtures as they finished with the silver medal. He had previously been called up for the 2009 Toulon Tournament.

Career statistics
.

Honours
Boca Juniors
Copa Argentina: 2011–12

Talleres
Primera B Nacional: 2016

References

External links

1991 births
Living people
People from La Matanza Partido
Argentine footballers
Argentina youth international footballers
Argentina under-20 international footballers
Footballers at the 2011 Pan American Games
Pan American Games medalists in football
Pan American Games silver medalists for Argentina
Association football defenders
Argentine expatriate footballers
Expatriate footballers in Colombia
Expatriate footballers in Chile
Argentine expatriate sportspeople in Colombia
Argentine expatriate sportspeople in Chile
Argentine Primera División players
Primera Nacional players
Primera B de Chile players
Chilean Primera División players
Boca Juniors footballers
Club Atlético Douglas Haig players
Godoy Cruz Antonio Tomba footballers
Olimpo footballers
Ferro Carril Oeste footballers
Talleres de Córdoba footballers
Club Atlético Temperley footballers
Nueva Chicago footballers
Cúcuta Deportivo footballers
Deportes La Serena footballers
San Telmo footballers
Medalists at the 2011 Pan American Games
Sportspeople from Buenos Aires Province
20th-century Argentine people
21st-century Argentine people